Una questione privata may refer to:

 A Private Matter (book), an Italian novel by Beppe Fenoglio
 Rainbow: A Private Affair,  an Italian film by Paolo and Vittorio Taviani